Gammliavallen, currently known as Umeå Energi Arena for sponsorship reasons, is a multi-purpose stadium in Umeå, Sweden. It is currently used mostly for football matches and is the home stadium of Umeå IK, Umeå FC and Team TG FF. The stadium holds 10,000 people. Between 2011 and 2015, it was known as T3 Arena for sponsorship reasons.  The sports complex also contains indoor sports halls and conference facilities.

References

External links 

Stadium information 

Football venues in Sweden
Multi-purpose stadiums in Sweden
Buildings and structures in Umeå
Sport in Umeå
1925 establishments in Sweden
Sports venues completed in 1925